Mickledore (the name means great door or pass) is a narrow ridge, 840 metres (2755 ft) high, connecting the mountains of Scafell and Scafell Pike in the English Lake District. It is also a pass between the valleys of Wasdale and Eskdale.

Ridge
The ridge is easily reached and traversed from Scafell Pike to the north, or from the valleys to the east and west. However, access to the summit of Scafell is barred by the rockface of Broad Stand, which looks much easier to climb than it is. It is a steep buttress wall requiring sequential bouldering moves, which have been described as anything from scrambling to rock climbing. It is described as 'extremely dangerous' by Wasdale Mountain Rescue Team, and the climb is "Difficult" in the British grading system. In descent, the cliff is even more dangerous. The poet Samuel Taylor Coleridge probably made a descent of Broad Stand on 5 August 1802; he wrote:

The next 3 drops were not half a Foot, at least not a foot more than my own height, but every Drop increased the Palsy of my Limbs — I shook all over, Heaven knows without the least influence of Fear, and now I had only two more to drop down, to return was impossible — but of these two the first was tremendous, it was twice my own height, and the Ledge at the bottom was so exceedingly narrow, that if I dropt down upon it I must of necessity have fallen backwards and of course killed myself. My Limbs were all in a tremble — I lay upon my Back to rest myself, and was beginning according to my Custom to laugh at myself for a Madman, when the sight of the Crags above me on each side, and the impetuous Clouds just over them, posting so luridly and so rapidly northward, overawed me. I lay in a state of almost prophetic Trance and Delight — and blessed God aloud, for the powers of Reason and the Will, which remaining no Danger can overpower us! 

The walker seeking a safe route between England's highest mountains must go via Foxes Tarn, which involves a descent to 680 m or so, about 160 m below the height of the ridge. The more challenging routes of Lord's Rake, and the West Wall Traverse, offer alternative ways to reach Scafell.

In 1974, Flt Lt John Nowell and his crew - Fg Off Lex Brown and crewman, Sgt Brian Gladwell of Number 230 Squadron RAF, RV'd with a party of students from the Eskdale Outward Bound School near Wasdale head pub. A party of about 10 students were first flown to Mickledore. The help returned to the RV point and the MRT 'Box' was loaded crosswise into the help with the ends sticking out. The box was flown back to Mickledore where the 1st party manhandled the box out of the help - which only had the nose wheel in contact with the ridge. The help then went back to the RV point, collected the remaining chaps and landed up towards Scafell Pike on a patch of flatfish ground and shut down. The box was manoeuvred into position and once it was deemed secure, the crew flew everyone back to Eskdale School. A 10-minute film shot that day showing the help emerging from the clouds to land on the ridge where the box was extracted was shown in its entirety of the 6 o'clock ITV news. The photographs taken that day was published in the book, 'A Day Above The Lake District' ISBN 978-1-904566-14-4. The book contains a specially written amusing poem by Pam Ayers to be the Foreword to the book. (Information source by John J. Nowell BA(Hons) Cfs FRGS LRPS RAF Red)

See also
List of hill passes of the Lake District

References

Mountain passes of the Lake District
Landforms of Cumbria
Borough of Copeland